This list is of the Intangible Cultural Properties of Japan in the Prefecture of Kagoshima.

National Cultural Properties
As of 1 August 2015, zero Important Intangible Cultural Properties have been designated.

Prefectural Cultural Properties
As of 1 April 2015, three properties have been designated at a prefectural level.

Performing Arts

Municipal Cultural Properties
As of 1 April 2015, six properties have been designated at a municipal level.

References

External links
  Cultural Properties in Kagoshima Prefecture
  List of National and Prefectural Cultural Properties in Kagoshima Prefecture

Culture in Kagoshima Prefecture
Kagoshima